Lu Dongliang (born December 1973) is a Chinese executive and politician who is the current party secretary of Datong, in office since November 2021. Previously he served as vice governor of Shanxi, and before that, chairman and party branch secretary of the Aluminum Corporation of China Limited. 

He joined the Chinese Communist Party (CCP) in May 1993 and began his political career in May 2020. He is a representative of the 20th National Congress of the Chinese Communist Party and an alternate member of the 20th Central Committee of the Chinese Communist Party.

Biography
Lu was born in Kangping County, Liaoning, in December 1973. In 1991, he entered North China University of Technology, where he majored in accounting. 

After graduating in 1995, Lu became an official in the Audit Department of China National Nonferrous Metals Industry Corporation and then the Finance Department of Preparatory Group of China Copper Lead Zinc Group Corporation. Starting in October 2010, he served in several posts in the Aluminum Corporation of China Limited, including manager of General Management Division, deputy general manager and general manager of Finance Department, and general manager of Lanzhou Branch. He was promoted to deputy general manager in April 2016, concurrently serving as chairman and party branch secretary since February 2019.

Lu was appointed vice governor of Shanxi in May 2020 and in October 2021 was admitted to member of the Standing Committee of the CCP Shanxi Provincial Committee, the province's top authority. In November 2021, he was chosen as party secretary of Datong, the top political position in the city.

References

1973 births
Living people
People from Kangping County
North China University of Technology alumni
People's Republic of China politicians from Liaoning
Chinese Communist Party politicians from Liaoning
Alternate members of the 20th Central Committee of the Chinese Communist Party